LY-272,015 is a beta-carboline derivative drug developed by Eli Lilly, which acts as a potent and selective antagonist at the serotonin 5-HT2B receptor. It has anti-hypertensive effects in animal models, and is also used in research into the other functions of the 5-HT2B receptor.

References 

5-HT2B antagonists
Beta-Carbolines
Tryptamines
Eli Lilly and Company brands
Phenol ethers